Phragmipedium richteri is a natural hybrid (P. boissierianum × pearcei) of orchid endemic to Peru.

References

External links 

richteri
Endemic orchids of Peru
Orchid hybrids